Diana Bishop ( Preston born 28 September 1947) is a retired British rower who competed for Great Britain at the 1976 Summer Olympics.

Rowing career
Bishop won the single sculls and the quadruple sculls, rowing for the Wallingford Rowing Club, at the 1975 National Rowing Championships. This led to selection for the British lightweight single scull boat at the 1975 World Rowing Championships in Nottingham, she finished 12th overall after a sixth-place finish in the B final.

In 1976 she was chosen for Great Britain in the women's coxed four event with Pauline Bird-Hart, Clare Grove, Gillian Webb and Pauline Wright. The crew finished in eighth place.

Personal life
She married fellow international rower Thomas Bishop.

References

1947 births
Living people
British female rowers
Olympic rowers of Great Britain
Rowers at the 1976 Summer Olympics
Place of birth missing (living people)